The Los Angeles Angels of Anaheim are a Major League Baseball franchise based in Anaheim, California near Los Angeles. Formed in 1961, they play in the American League West division. Also known in their early years as Los Angeles Angels (1961–1965), California Angels (1966–1996), and Anaheim Angels (1997–2004), pitchers for the Angels have thrown 10 no-hitters in franchise history. A no-hitter is officially recognized by Major League Baseball only "when a pitcher (or pitchers) allows no hits during the entire course of a game, which consists of at least nine innings", though one or more batters "may reach base via a walk, an error, a hit by pitch, a passed ball or wild pitch on strike three, or catcher's interference". No-hitters of less than nine complete innings were previously recognized by the league as official; however, several rule alterations in 1991 changed the rule to its current form. Mike Witt threw the only perfect game, a special subcategory of no-hitter, in Angels history on September 30, 1984. As defined by Major League Baseball, "in a perfect game, no batter reaches any base during the course of the game."

Bo Belinsky threw the first no-hitter in Angels history on May 5, 1962; the most recent no-hitter was thrown by Reid Detmers on May 10, 2022. Two left-handed starting pitchers have thrown no-hitters in franchise history. The longest interval between no-hitters was between the games pitched by Langston/Witt and Santana, encompassing more than 21 years from April 11, 1990 till July 27, 2011. Conversely, the shortest interval between no-hitters was between the games pitched by Nolan Ryan, encompassing 2 months from May 15, 1973 to July 15, 1973. They no-hit the Baltimore Orioles the most, which occurred twice, which were no-hit by Belinsky in 1962 and Nolan Ryan in 1975. There has been one no-hitter in which the team allowed at least a run. Ervin Santana's no-hitter on July 27, 2011 had an unearned run score on a wild pitch in the first inning, but then Santana settled down and completed his rare feat. The most baserunners allowed in a no-hitter was by Ryan (in 1974), who allowed eight. Six no-hitters were thrown at home, and four were thrown on the road. They threw one in April, three in May, one in June, three in July, and two in September. Of the 10 no-hitters, three have been won by a score of 1–0, more common than any other results. The largest margin of victory in a no-hitter was 13–0 win by Cole and Peña on July 12, 2019. The smallest margin of victory was 1–0 wins by Ryan in 1975, Mike Witt in 1984 and a combined no-hitter led by Langston in 1990.

The umpire is also an integral part of any no-hitter. The task of the umpire in a baseball game is to make any decision "which involves judgment, such as, but not limited to, whether a batted ball is fair or foul, whether a pitch is a strike or a ball, or whether a runner is safe or out… [the umpire's judgment on such matters] is final." Part of the duties of the umpire making calls at home plate includes defining the strike zone, which "is defined as that area over homeplate (sic) the upper limit of which is a horizontal line at the midpoint between the top of the shoulders and the top of the uniform pants, and the lower level is a line at the hollow beneath the kneecap." These calls define every baseball game and are therefore integral to the completion of any no-hitter. A different umpire presided over each of the franchise's ten no-hitters.

The manager is another integral part of any no-hitter. The tasks of the manager include determining the starting rotation as well as batting order and defensive lineup every game. Nine different managers have been involved in the franchise's eleven no-hitters.

List of Angels no-hitters

See also
List of Major League Baseball no-hitters

References

No-hitter
Los Angeles Angels